Yengejeh-ye Sadat (also Romanized as Yengejeh-ye Şādāt, Yengejeh-ye Sādāt, and Yengjeh Sādāt) is a village in Harzandat-e Gharbi Rural District, in the Central District of Marand County, East Azerbaijan Province, Iran. At the 2006 census, its population was 26, in 10 families.

References 

Populated places in Marand County